Crescent Hill may refer to the following:

Crescent Hill, Louisville - a neighborhood in Louisville, Kentucky
Crescent Hill (Springfield) - a neighborhood and historic district in Springfield, Massachusetts
Crescent Hill, Missouri, an unincorporated community